A list of films produced in Argentina in 1981:

1981

External links and references
 Argentine films of 1981 at the Internet Movie Database

1981
Argentina
Films